Charles Boli (born 30 August 1998) is a French-Scottish professional footballer who plays as a midfielder for Ligue 2 club Pau FC.

He is the son of footballer Roger Boli, and as a result he also holds French and Ivorian citizenships.

Career
On 16 May 2019, Boli signed his first professional contract with Lens. He made his professional first match for Lens in a 2–1 Coupe de la Ligue win over Troyes on 13 August 2019. He signed a new four-year contract with Lens in January 2020. He moved on loan to Paris FC in January 2021. On 7 January 2022, he moved on loan to Vicenza in the Italian Serie B.

Boli joined Ligue 2 side Pau on a two-year contract in August 2022.

Personal life
Boli is the son of the Ivorian former footballer Roger Boli, nephew of French international footballer Basile Boli, and cousin of Ivorian footballer Yannick Boli. Boli's brothers, Kévin and Yohan Boli, are also professional footballers, who have represented Ivory Coast internationally. 

Boli was born in Dundee, while his father played for Dundee United, and so holds a British passport.

References

External links
 
 
 
 
 La Depeche Profile

1998 births
Living people
Scottish people of Ivorian descent
Scottish emigrants to France
Sportspeople from Pas-de-Calais
French sportspeople of Ivorian descent
French footballers
Footballers from Hauts-de-France
Scottish footballers
Association football midfielders
RC Lens players
Paris FC players
L.R. Vicenza players
Pau FC players
Ligue 2 players
Championnat National 2 players
Serie B players
Boli family
Scottish expatriate footballers
French expatriate footballers
Expatriate footballers in Italy
Scottish expatriate sportspeople in Italy
French expatriate sportspeople in Italy